The 2022 Gibraltar Darts Trophy was the thirteenth of thirteen PDC European Tour events on the 2022 PDC Pro Tour. The tournament took place at the Tercentenary Sports Hall, Gibraltar, Gibraltar, from 14–16 October 2022. It featured a field of 48 players and £140,000 in prize money, with £25,000 going to the winner.

Gerwyn Price was the defending champion, after defeating Mensur Suljović 8–0 in the 2021 final. However, he was defeated by Suljović 4–6 in the second round.

Damon Heta won his first European title, defeating Peter Wright 8–7 in the final.

Prize money
The prize money is unchanged from the European Tours of the last 3 years:

 Seeded players who lose in the second round and host nation qualifiers (who qualify automatically as a result of their ranking) who lose in their first match of the event shall not be credited with prize money on any Order of Merit. A player who qualifies as a qualifier, but later becomes a seed due to the withdrawal of one or more other players shall be credited with their prize money on all Orders of Merit regardless of how far they progress in the event.

Qualification and format
The top 16 entrants from the PDC ProTour Order of Merit on 26 July automatically qualified for the event and were seeded in the second round.

The remaining 32 places went to players from six qualifying events – 24 from the Tour Card Holder Qualifier (held on 2 August), two from the Associate Member Qualifier (held on 28 August), as Gibraltar has no players on the Order of Merit, four places will come from the Host Nation Qualifier (held on 13 October), one from the Nordic & Baltic Associate Member Qualifier (held on 30 July), and one from the East European Associate Member Qualifier (held on 26 June).

Two additional places were made available in the Host Nation Qualifier following the withdrawals of Tour Card Qualifier Krzysztof Kciuk and East European Qualifier Karel Sedláček. Gibraltarian qualifier Justin Hewitt withdrew after the draw through illness, giving his first round opponent a first round bye.

The following players took part in the tournament:

Top 16
  (quarter-finals)
  (semi-finals)
  (second round)
  (second round)
  (semi-finals)
  (champion)
  (quarter-finals)
  (third round)
  (runner-up)
  (third round)
  (third round)
  (second round)
  (third round)
  (second round)
  (third round)
  (second round)

Tour Card Qualifier
  (first round)
  (second round)
  (first round)
  (second round)
  (third round)
  (second round)
  (first round)
  (first round)
  (first round)
  (first round)
  (quarter-finals)
  (second round)
  (first round)
  (first round)
  (first round)
  (third round)
  (second round)
  (quarter-finals)
  (second round)
  (second round)
  (first round)
  (second round)
  (first round)

Associate Member Qualifier
  (second round)
  (third round)

Host Nation Qualifier
  Sean Negrette (first round)
  (first round)
  Dylan Duo Jr (first round)
  (first round)
  Craig Galliano (second round)
  Justin Hewitt (withdrew)

Nordic & Baltic Qualifier
  (first round)

Draw

Notes

References

2022 PDC Pro Tour
2022 PDC European Tour
2022 in Gibraltarian sport
October 2022 sports events in Europe